Man of the World was an ATV drama series, distributed by ITC Entertainment. The show ran in the United Kingdom in 1962 and 1963 for 20 one-hour episodes in monochrome.

Plot
The series stars Craig Stevens as Michael Strait, a world-renowned photographer whose assignments lead him into investigating mysterious goings-on amongst the rich and glamorous and intrigue from far-flung places as Iraq, French Indo-China and Algiers.  Tracy Reed co-stars in the first series.

Cast

Main cast

Craig Stevens as Michael Strait
Tracy Reed as Maggie MacFarlane (Series 1)

Guest cast
Warren Mitchell, Shirley Eaton, Carlos Thompson, Burt Kwouk, Anthony Quayle, Patrick Troughton, Sam Wanamaker, Patrick Wymark, Eric Pohlmann, Leela Naidu and Donald Sutherland.

Production

Music
The series' theme music was by Henry Mancini, with incidental music under the control of Ivor Slaney using many musical cues of Edwin Astley.

Episodes
Airdate is for ATV London. ITV regions varied date and order.

Production number here refers to the order of the Network DVD.

Series one
Filmed on location and at Shepperton Studios

Series two

References

External links

TV.com entry

1962 British television series debuts
1963 British television series endings
1960s British drama television series
British crime television series
British drama television series
Television series by ITC Entertainment
ITV television dramas
Television series about journalism
Television shows produced by Associated Television (ATV)
English-language television shows
Black-and-white British television shows